Pasaka Cinema is a former Art Deco style movie theater in Kaunas, Lithuania. At that time of the opening, the cinema was amongst the most modern in Kaunas.

References

Cinemas in Lithuania
Buildings and structures in Kaunas
Commercial buildings completed in 1939
1939 establishments in Lithuania